

 Alfred Ritter von Hubicki (5 February 1887 – 14 July 1971) was a Hungarian-born general in the Wehrmacht of Nazi Germany during World War II.

By the time of the Anschluss of Austria in 1938 he had reached the rank of Generalmajor as the commander of the Austrian Army motorized division and transferred to the Wehrmacht with the same rank and was appointed commander of the 4th Light Division upon its formation in Vienna. The unit was renamed the 9th Panzer Division and Hubicki commanded it through the invasion of Poland in which it took part in the Battle of Jordanów and Battle of Jaroslaw. It then took part in the invasions of France and The Netherlands and Hubicki was promoted to Generalleutnant in August 1940. He then led the division in the Balkans and was awarded the Knight's Cross of the Iron Cross for his role in that campaign.

He was promoted to General der Panzertruppe on 1 October 1942 and after commanding a special unit at the OKW he was appointed as the head of the German Military Mission to Slovakia. He was retired from active service in March 1945 and died in 1971.

Awards
 Order of the Iron Crown III. Class with War Decoration (19 November 1917)
 Iron Cross (1939) 2nd Class (18 September 1939) & 1st Class (23 September 1939)
 Eastern Front Medal (9 September 1942)
 Knight's Cross of the Iron Cross on 20 April 1941 as Generalleutnant and commander of the 9. Panzer-Division

References

Citations

Bibliography

 
 
 

1887 births
1971 deaths
Austro-Hungarian military personnel of World War I
Austro-Hungarian Army officers
Generals of Panzer Troops
Austrian generals
Recipients of the Gold German Cross
Recipients of the Knight's Cross of the Iron Cross
Austrian military personnel of World War II
German Army generals of World War II